The Machiguenga Communal Reserve (Reserva Comunal Machiguenga) is a protected area in Peru located in the Cusco Region, La Convención Province,  Megantoni district.

See also 
 Machiguenga
 Natural and Cultural Peruvian Heritage
 Megantoni National Sanctuary

External links 
 www.parkswatch.org / Machiguenga Communal Reserve 
 www.enjoyperu.com / Machiguenga Communal Reserve 

Communal reserves of Peru
Geography of Cusco Region